USS LCI(L)-1092 was an  built for the United States Navy in World War II.  Like most ships of her class, she was not named and known only by her designation.

Operational history
LCI(L)-1092 was laid down at Defoe Shipbuilding Co. in Bay City, Michigan and commissioned 23 September 1944, two days after the commissioning of the 1091.

She was assigned to the Pacific Theatre and participated in the assault and occupation of Okinawa Gunto from 28 April to 30 June 1945.  After a short hiatus, it was on occupation duty from 2 September to 16 December 1945. The LCI(L)-1092 received two battle stars for World War II action.

References

LCI(L)-351-class large infantry landing craft
World War II amphibious warfare vessels of the United States
Ships built in Bay City, Michigan
1944 ships